David Scott Lucas (born May 10, 1970) is an American musician, who is best known for being the guitarist, bassist, and lead vocalist for Local H, as well as the lead vocalist and guitarist of Scott Lucas and the Married Men.

Lucas co-founded Local H in Zion, Illinois, in 1987 with high school friends, bassist Matthew "Matt" Garcia and drummer Joe Daniels, along with lead guitarist John Sparkman. Sparkman left the band in 1991, and Garcia left in 1993, and Lucas added bass pickups to his guitar to compensate; Daniels left the band in July 1999 and was replaced by Brian St. Clair, leaving Lucas as the only remaining original band member. Local H has released several albums, including a covers record in 2010. Lucas is also a member of the electronic band, The Prairie Cartel, and has released three albums through his solo project, Scott Lucas and the Married Men, which he founded in 2010. He was also in a cover band called The Cold Space, featuring Randy Payne and Tom Szidon from Scott Lucas and the Married Men. He has also performed as a touring bassist for The Tossers, featuring members from Scott Lucas and the Married Men.

In February 2013, Lucas was attacked and robbed after playing a show in Russia. During the attack, Lucas lost his voice and sustained damage to his vocal cords. Lucas quickly regained his voice, but Local H was forced to cancel a string of concerts as a precaution as his vocal cords healed; Lucas has since returned to touring with Local H and Scott Lucas and the Married Men.

References 

1970 births
20th-century American singers
21st-century American singers
Alternative rock bass guitarists
Alternative rock guitarists
Alternative rock singers
American alternative rock musicians
American male bass guitarists
American male singer-songwriters
American rock bass guitarists
American rock guitarists
American rock singers
American rock songwriters
Lead guitarists
Living people
Local H members
Singers from Chicago
20th-century American bass guitarists
21st-century American bass guitarists
Guitarists from Chicago
20th-century American male singers
21st-century American male singers
Island Records artists
Thick Records artists
Cleopatra Records artists
Singer-songwriters from Illinois